Jon Foster is an American freelance illustrator, penciler, and sculptor.

Biography
Foster is best known for his comic book covers (DC Comics, Dark Horse Comics) and other works featured in role-playing games such as Dungeons & Dragons and Alternity.

Jon Foster studied illustration at the Rhode Island School of Design and graduated in 1989. His paintings are oils on canvas and are known to have a dark or muted color palette. Typically, they incorporate subject matter like good vs. evil, anger, and adventure. Before a project is complete, Foster scans his paintings into a computer to add digital effects.

Earlier in his career, Jon collaborated with artists such as Rick Berry and Dave Dorman (well known Star Wars artist).

Foster has illustrated cards for the Magic: The Gathering collectible card game.

Some of his achievements include multiple awards from the prestigious Spectrum sci-fi and fantasy art publications.

Jon lives in Providence, Rhode Island.

Works

Books
 Progressions (February 2003)
 Revolution: The Art of Jon Foster (November 2006)

Book covers
 Star Wars: The New Jedi Order: Force Heretic Trilogy by Sean Williams and Shane Dix (Del Rey Books, 2003)
 The Uninvited (May 2004)
 Snake Agent by Liz Williams (Night Shade Books, September 2005)
 The Dragonback series by Timothy Zahn (Starscape Books, 2005)
 The Demon and the City by Liz Williams (Night Shade Books, August 2006)
 Dark Harvest by Norman Partridge (Cemetery Dance, 2006)
 Mistborn: The Final Empire, Mistborn: The Well of Ascension, and Mistborn: Hero of Ages by Brandon Sanderson
 The Chronicles of Master Li and Number Ten Ox by Barry Hughart (Subterranean Press, 2008) 
 Fender Lizards by Joe R. Lansdale (Subterranean Press, 2015)

Comics
 Aliens vs. Predator vs. Terminator
 Batman: the Ring, the Arrow and the Bat
 Hunter
 The Nightmare Factory - Volume 2
 Species
 Star Wars
 Buffy the Vampire Slayer

Other references
 Spectrum 6 (December 1999)
 Spectrum 8 (November 2001)
 Spectrum 9 (December 2002)
 Spectrum 10 (October 2003)
 Spectrum 11 (November 2004)

References

External links
 Jon Foster's official website
 

20th-century American male artists
20th-century American painters
21st-century American male artists
21st-century American painters
American illustrators
American male painters
American speculative fiction artists
Fantasy artists
Game artists
Living people
Rhode Island School of Design alumni
Role-playing game artists
Year of birth missing (living people)